Beljevac is a village situated Mladenovac municipality in Serbia.

References

Suburbs of Belgrade